Stadionul Mircea Eliade is a football stadium in Moldova built in 2015. It is based in city Nisporeni.

References

External links
soccerway 

Football venues in Moldova
Multi-purpose stadiums
Speranța Nisporeni